Luis Sarria (1911-1991) was a Cuban-American boxer who went on to become a trainer, masseur, and cutman. He was born on October 29, 1911 in Cumanayagua, Cuba, and died on November 19, 1991. He was posthumously inducted into the Florida Boxing Hall of Fame in 2013.

Career
Sarria was a member of Muhammad Ali's entourage for almost the entire duration of Ali's career. Prior to working with Ali, Sarria had worked with several prominent boxers including Luis Manuel Rodríguez, Florentino Fernández, Angel Robinson Garcia, and almost all boxers trained by Angelo Dundee up till then.

Ferdie Pacheco called Sarria  "the dean of masseurs", and a "guru of fitness." According to Pacheco, Ali had handed over his body, and consequently his health and career, to Sarria. In an interview with Sports Illustrated, Angelo Dundee expressed his appreciation for Sarria's professional competence which, according to Dundee, resulted in enhancing Ali's physical fitness and "added years to Ali's boxing life." According to Gary Smith, it was widely believed that Sarria's fingers were able to dissolve fat on Ali's body.

Commenting on the times when he was a part of Ali's entourage, Sarria had observed:

References

1911 births
1991 deaths

American boxing trainers
Sports masseurs
Cutmen
Cuban emigrants to the United States